Álvaro Carrillo Alacid (born 6 April 2002) is a Spanish professional footballer who plays as a centre-back for Real Madrid Castilla.

Career statistics

Club

Honours 

 Real Madrid Juvenil A

 UEFA Youth League: 2019–20

References

External links 
 Real Madrid profile
 
 
 

2002 births
Living people
Footballers from Murcia
Spanish footballers
Association football defenders
Real Madrid Castilla footballers
Segunda División B players
Primera Federación players
Spain youth international footballers